The Blooming Angel is a 1920 American silent comedy film directed by Victor Schertzinger and starring Madge Kennedy, Pat O'Malley, and Margery Wilson.

Cast
 Madge Kennedy as Floss 
 Pat O'Malley as Chester Framm 
 Margery Wilson as Carlotta 
 Arthur Housman as Ramon 
 James Robert Chandler as College Professor 
 Vera Lewis as Floss's Aunt 
 F. Blinn as Appelwaith 
 William Courtright as Holbetter

References

Bibliography
 James Robert Parish & Michael R. Pitts. Film directors: a guide to their American films. Scarecrow Press, 1974.

External links
 

1920 films
1920 comedy films
1920s English-language films
American silent feature films
Silent American comedy films
Films directed by Victor Schertzinger
American black-and-white films
Goldwyn Pictures films
1920s American films